Mariposa County Unified School District is a public school district in Mariposa County, California, United States. It contains 1 high school, 2 K-8 schools, and 4 elementary schools.

The racial breakdown of students is 66.9% White, 19.5% Hispanic or Latino, 4.1% American Indian or Alaska Native, 0.8% Filipino, 0.7% Asian, 0.5% African American, and 6.4% Multiracial.

Schools

High schools 

 Mariposa County High School

K-8 Schools 

 Mariposa Elementary School
 Woodland Elementary School

Elementary schools 

 Greeley Hill Elementary School & Coulterville High School
 El Portal Elementary School & High School
 Lake Don Pedro Elementary School
 Yosemite Valley Elementary School

External links

References 

School districts in California